Harsum is a village and a municipality in the district of Hildesheim, in Lower Saxony, Germany. It is situated approximately 6 km north of Hildesheim, and 25 km southeast of Hanover.

Subdivisions
Besides Harsum proper, the municipality consists of the villages of Adlum, Asel, Borsum, Hönnersum, Hüddessum, Klein Förste, Machtsum and Rautenberg.

Personalities 
 Johannes Nordhoff (1870-1950), Chairman of the Employers' Association of German Insurance Companies
 Joop Bergsma (1928-2011), Roman Catholic clergyman and theologian

References 

Hildesheim (district)